Daniel Henry is the name of:

Daniel Maynadier Henry (1823–1899), Maryland politician
Dan Henry (1913–2012), inventor of bicycle route markings
M. Daniel Henry, Catholic university administrator

See also
Henry Daniel (disambiguation)